GP Series may refer to:
 Geometric progression, a mathematical series
 G.P., an Australian medical TV series
 Texas Mini GP Series, an organization hosting motorcycle road races